Tam O'Shanter Point is a headland located in South Mission Beach, Cassowary Coast Region, Queensland, Australia on the north-eastern part of Rockingham Bay in the Coral Sea.  It is part of the Coastal Wet Tropics Important Bird Area, identified as such by BirdLife International because of its importance for the conservation of lowland tropical rainforest birds.

History
The point was named by Captain Owen Stanley of the Royal Navy survey ship , after the barque Tam O'Shanter which was the ship the explorer Edmund Kennedy sailed to North Queensland on his ill-fated expedition to reach Cape York Peninsula in 1848.

Note

References

Headlands of Queensland
Important Bird Areas of Queensland